Bonneville High School is a secondary high school in Washington Terrace, Utah, United States.

History
Bonneville first opened its doors in the fall of 1960 to approximately 900 students, including freshmen. The school was built to address the overwhelming population growth (attributed to the post-war "baby boom") at the south end of Weber County.

The school was built at a large cost to the Weber County School District. Every effort was made to make Bonneville reflect the latest in technology and culture. The building itself was designed with large, open spaces such as a central courtyard and smaller atriums spread throughout the campus.

As the area continued to grow, it became necessary to renovate the buildings to house a larger student population. Along with closing in the main courtyard and adding a new building behind the main structure, the freshman class was moved back into junior highs and middle schools.  Several other additions and renovations have occurred since the 1970s.

T.H. Bell Junior High and South Ogden Junior High feed into Bonneville.

State championships

1962-3 Lynn Pehrson, Wrestling Champion
1964-5 Mike Boyle and Craig Rock, Wrestling Champions
1975-6 Men's Track 4A Champions
1978-9 Men's Cross Country 4A Champions
1979-80 Men's Cross Country 4A Champions
1980-1 Men's Football 4A Champions
1981-2 Men's Cross Country 4A Champions
1984-5 Todd Wheelwright, Wrestling 4A State Heavyweight Champion
1984-5 Men's Basketball 4A Champions
1985-6 Men's Cross Country 4A Champions
1986-7 Men's Basketball 4A Champions
1988-9 Larry Hanson, Wrestling 4A 189 lb. State Champion 
1994-5 Joshua Iverson, Wrestling 4A 145 lb. State Champion
2003-4 Women's 4A Softball Champions
2004-5 Women's 4A Softball Champions
2005-6 Lakette Drill Team First Place State Champions
2006-7 Men's Golf 4A Champions
2007-8 Utah Winter Drumline Association Scholastic A Champions
2007-8 Lakette Drill Team First Place State Champions
2008-9 Women's 4A Soccer Champions
2010-11 Women's 4A Soccer Champions
2010-11 Men's 4A State Golf Champions
2010-11 Women's 4A State Golf Champions
2011-12 Women's 4A State Golf Champions
2012-13 Women's 4A Soccer Champions
2014-15 Laker Cheer Team First Place State Champions
Note: 4A classification was largest in the state of Utah until 1996.

Notable alumni
Tanoka Beard - professional basketball player
Corey Clark - controversial American Idol contestant who was disqualified over criminal history
Ed Eyestone - two-time Olympic marathoner, 1988 and 1992; third in the world in 1980 IAAF Cross-Country Juniors in Paris; ten-time All American Track and Cross Country; NCAA record of 27:41.05 in the 10,000 meter; four-time NCAA Champion; undefeated in 1984 NCAA; Head Coach at BYU
Andy Ludwig - collegiate offensive coordinator
Mason Unck - former NFL football player for the Cleveland Browns

External links
Bonneville High School
Weber School District

References

 Official UHSAA site with past champions

Public high schools in Utah
Educational institutions established in 1960
Schools in Weber County, Utah
1960 establishments in Utah